Amik Robertson (born July 6, 1998) is an American football cornerback for the Las Vegas Raiders of the National Football League (NFL). He played college football at Louisiana Tech.

Early years
Robertson attended Thibodaux High School in Thibodaux, Louisiana. A 3-star recruit, Robertson committed to Louisiana Tech to play football over offers from Houston, Kansas State, and LSU, among others.

College career
Robertson played at Louisiana Tech University from 2017 to 2019. He became a starter his freshman year and remained there throughout his college career. As a freshman he was the Defensive MVP of the 2017 Frisco Bowl. As a junior he was named a first-team All-American by the Football Writers Association of America (FWAA). He finished his career with 184 tackles, 14 interceptions, four sacks and three touchdowns. After his junior season, he entered the 2020 NFL Draft, forgoing his senior season.

Professional career

Robertson was selected by the Las Vegas Raiders in the fourth round with the 139th pick in the 2020 NFL draft.

References

External links
Louisiana Tech Bulldogs bio

1998 births
Living people
Sportspeople from Thibodaux, Louisiana
Players of American football from Louisiana
American football cornerbacks
Louisiana Tech Bulldogs football players
Las Vegas Raiders players
All-American college football players